John McClain Storzer (May 31, 1920 – November 1, 1973) was an American football and baseball player and coach and college athletics administrator. He served as the head football coach at Ripon College in Ripon, Wisconsin from 1958 to 1973, compiling a record of 87–39–43. Storzer was also the head baseball coach at Ripon from 1958 to 1971 and in again in 1973, tallying a mark of 133–76.

Storzer died on November 1, 1973, at Ripon Memorial Hospital in Ripon, after suffering a heart attack.

Head coaching record

College football

Notes

References

External links
 

1920 births
1973 deaths
Ripon Red Hawks athletic directors
Ripon Red Hawks baseball coaches
Ripon Red Hawks football coaches
Wisconsin–River Falls Falcons baseball players
Wisconsin–River Falls Falcons football players
Wisconsin–River Falls Falcons men's basketball players
High school football coaches in Wisconsin
People from Oconto County, Wisconsin
Coaches of American football from Wisconsin
Players of American football from Wisconsin
Baseball coaches from Wisconsin
Baseball players from Wisconsin
Basketball players from Wisconsin